Huddart is a surname. Notable people with the surname include:

 Claire Huddart (born 1971), British swimmer 
 Dick Huddart (1936–2021), English-Australian rugby league footballer (father of Milton)
 James Huddart (1847–1901), British shipowner 
 John J. Huddart (1856–1930), British-American architect
 Joseph Huddart (1741–1816), British hydrographer
 Milton Huddart (1960–2015), English rugby league footballer (son of Dick)
 Kimberley Huddart (born 1986), British Cat Collector